Stephen Garlick (born 7 July 1959) is a British actor best known as the voice of Jen in Jim Henson's The Dark Crystal.

His career has centered on film, television and radio. At the age of five he attended the famous Corona Academy stage school. As most children of his age he did a few television commercials. In 1965 he featured in a documentary called A Day of Peace, directed by noted film director Peter Collinson. Garlick had a non-speaking part as a small boy with a potty stuck on his head in Carry On Doctor (1967). He appeared in two films in the 1960s made by the Children's Film Foundation. He played the part of Dan in The Boy from Space for BBC Schools. This was released on DVD by the British Film Institute.

Career
In 1973, Garlick played the role of Ned Lewis in the second series of The Adventures of Black Beauty. He also appeared in another film for the Children's Film Foundation in 1975 called The Hostages. A year later he played an alien called Kwaan in the Thames Television sci-fi series The Tomorrow People. He played the part of Tim Moffat in the controversial six-part serial, Two People, for London Weekend Television. Other television appearances include The Houseboy and Butterflies.

One of his more notable television appearances was as John Standen, the son of a duplicitous business man Ted Standen (Gareth Hunt) in the Minder episode "The Son Also Rises" in which he appeared with fellow Corona boy Dennis Waterman.

Garlick played Ibbotson in the Doctor Who story Mawdryn Undead. Other TV appearances included Lovejoy and The Bill. He has provided many voices for radio and TV commercials and also films. His best-known voice role is the main character Jen in Jim Henson's 1982 American–British fantasy film The Dark Crystal. He has twice been a member of the BBC Radio Drama Company appearing in many radio plays. He was a radio presenter for a short time on the recreation of the sixties offshore radio station, Radio London (Big L) between 2005 and 2008. Garlick has started appearing at conventions. Most notably a celebration of The Dark Crystal at Elstree Studios where the film was made. He appears to have retired from acting and now lives in Bedfordshire.

Filmography

References

External links

 

1959 births
English male film actors
English male television actors
English male voice actors
People from Stockwell
Living people